The International Day of Solidarity with the Palestinian People is a UN-organized observance. Events are held at the United Nations headquarters in New York, as well as at the United Nations offices at Geneva, Vienna and Nairobi. It is generally held on November 29 each year to mark the anniversary of resolution 181 which advocated for the partition of Palestine into two States: one Arab and one Jewish. In 2003, it was observed on December 1.

On this day every year, the United Nations urges immediate action in an effort to grant Palestinians sovereignty and independence from the Israeli Occupation. As the international community commemorates this day, it continues to call on Israel to provide Palestinians with their human rights according to the UN General Assembly. The General Assembly emphasizes its support of the Palestinians' right to return to their homes, which they have been displaced from in 1948 following the creation of the State of Israel, where more than 760,000 Palestinians became refugees.

The annual observance was established in UN General Assembly Resolution 32/40 B of 2 December 1977, to start in 1978. The same resolution proposed the creation of the study The Origins and Evolution of the Palestine Problem. 

In Resolution 34/65 D of 12 December 1979, the issue of commemorative postage stamps was requested.

Special commemorative activities are organized by the Division for Palestinian Rights of the United Nations Secretariat, in consultation with the Committee on the Exercise of the Inalienable Rights of the Palestinian People.

In 2001, several members and speakers at the United Nations event for the International Day of Solidarity with the Palestinians urged the creation of an "International Force in the Occupied Territories to protect the Palestinian people." Several countries including Malta, Turkey, and Bangladesh showed their solidarity with Palestinians to gain sovereignty.

In 2005,  the UN event included a map that showed all of Israel replaced by Palestine and was attended by Secretary-General Kofi Annan and other senior UN officials.

In 2018, professor and activist Marc Lamont Hill spoke at the United Nations, expressing his full support for the Palestinian cause. His speech received backlash as many saw his sentiments as anti-Semitic and he was later fired from CNN.

Marking the day in 2021, Secretary-General of the United Nations António Guterres tweeted, "The situation in the Occupied Palestinian Territory remains a challenge to int'l peace & security."

See also
 International Day of Quds
 Land Day
 Palestine and the United Nations
 Palestine
 Palestinian people
 Israeli–Palestinian conflict
 Arab–Israeli conflict
 Right to return
 United Nations Partition Plan for Palestine

References

United Nations operations in the Middle East
Israeli–Palestinian conflict and the United Nations
November observances
Solidarity with the Palestinian People, International Day of
December observances
Palestinian solidarity movement